The Caloundra International is a tennis tournament held in Caloundra, Australia. In 2004 it was held in November as the Uncle Tobys Challenger in Caloundra, then as the Kia International in Caloundra from 2005 to 2006, and the Caloundra ATP Challenger in 2007. The tournament returned in February 2011 as the Elite Tennis International.

Past finals

Singles

Doubles

References

External links
 

 
Caloundra